Stephan Chase (born Stephan de Montaignac; February 1945 - 27 June 2019) was a British actor of Cornish and Scots descent. He was educated in Ireland and England. Before joining the Royal Shakespeare Company, he won a scholarship and trained at the Royal Academy of Dramatic Art (RADA) later becoming an Associate of RADA.

He played Hamlet in 1975 in a British Council / Regent's Park Open Air Theatre touring production in India and Ceylon. He appeared as a leading man in feature films, TV plays and series and the West End theatre, such as Rules of the Game (1982), directed by Anthony Quayle, until he founded and ran the Rhubarb Agency 1988-2005. During this time, Chase also worked as an audio producer and director. He subsequently worked as a teacher and coach in London, but in 2011 he began working as an actor again.

He died on 27 June 2019 at the age of 74.

Filmography

Film
Cry of the Banshee (1970, Dir. Gordon Hessler) - Sean Whitman
Macbeth (1971, Dir. Roman Polanski) - Malcolm
The Incredible Sarah (1976, Dir. Richard Fleischer)
The Golden Lady (1979, Dir. José Ramón Larraz) - Max Rowlands
Nijinsky (1980, Dir. Herbert Ross) - Adolph Bolm
Al-mas' Ala Al-Kubra (1983, Dir. Mohamed Shukri Jameel) - Army Captain
White Mischief (1987, Dir. Michael Radford) - Carberry
The Child (2012, Short, Dir. Amy Neil)
Trained (2013, Dir. Anthony Jerjen, Winner LA Film Festival, Honolulu Film Festival and selected for London Raindance Film Festival 2013) - Robert
Maleficent (2014, Dir. Robert Stromberg (with Angelina Jolie) - General
The Hooligan Factory (2014, Dir. Nick Nevern) - The Governor
The Earth Belongs To No-One (2014, Short, dir. Ani Laurie; producer Rienkje Attoh) (Nominated for Best Short Film at the 2015 Raindance Film Festival) - Farmer Joseph
Francis (2014, dir. Paul Alexander. Production Company: A Little Portion Production) - Pope Innocent III
The Wager (2015, Short) - Harry
Finding Saint Francis (2015, Dir. Paul Alexander) - Pietro Bernadone, Mayor of Assisi
The Carer (2016, Dir. Christine Templeton-Parker) - Neville

Television
UFO (1970, Episode: "Mindbender") - Film Director
Wives and Daughters (1971) - Osborne Hamley
Arthur of the Britons (1972) - Horgren
The Edwardians (1972) - Kearey
Orson Welles Great Mysteries (1973, Episode: "Death of an Old-Fashioned Girl") - Paul Zachary
The Zoo Gang (1974) - Raoul
The Professionals (1977) - Dapper
Famous Five (1978) - Perton
Secret Army (1979, Prod Gerard Glaister) - Captain Stephen Durnford / Stephen Durnford
The Talisman (1980, Prod Barry Letts) - Richard I of England
Take Three Women (1982) - Joe
Black Arrow (1985, TV Movie, Dir. John Hough) - Black Arrow
Florence Nightingale (1985, TV Movie, Dir. Daryl Duke proposed for Emmy Nomination for Dr.Sutherland) - Dr. Sutherland
Dempsey and Makepeace (1986) - Edwards
A Ghost in Monte Carlo (1990, TV Movie) - Deal
The Governor (1995) - Architect Richard Greenleaves

Theatre
The musical, Katie Mulholland (1983 as Bernard Rosier, by Catherine Cookson DBE Dir Ken Hill (playwright))
The Teddy Bears' Picnic (1987 by David Pinner, Dir Philip Partridge)
Liberty Oregon (1994 as Novitski, at the Edinburgh Festival Dir Natasha Carlish)
Suddenly Last Summer (1996 as Cucrovitz, by Tennessee Williams)

References

External links
Stephan Chase Official Website

Trained, the 2013 Short

English male television actors
English male film actors
English male stage actors
English people of Cornish descent
English people of Scottish descent
1945 births
2019 deaths
Alumni of RADA
Date of birth missing